Birger Cederin (20 April 1895 – 22 March 1942) was a Swedish fencer. He won a silver medal in the team épée event at the 1936 Summer Olympics.

References

External links

 

1895 births
1942 deaths
Swedish male épée fencers
Olympic fencers of Sweden
Fencers at the 1936 Summer Olympics
Olympic silver medalists for Sweden
Sportspeople from Jönköping
Olympic medalists in fencing
Medalists at the 1936 Summer Olympics
19th-century Swedish people
20th-century Swedish people